The following outline is provided as an overview of and topical guide to the U.S. state of Minnesota:

Minnesota – U.S. state located in the Midwestern United States. The twelfth largest state of the U.S., it is the twenty-first most populous, with 5.3 million residents. Minnesota was carved out of the eastern half of the Minnesota Territory and admitted to the Union as the thirty-second state on May 11, 1858. Known as the Land of 10,000 Lakes, the state's name comes from a Dakota word for "sky-tinted water".

General reference 

 Names
 Common name: Minnesota
 Pronunciation: 
 Official name: State of Minnesota
 Abbreviations and name codes
 Postal symbol:  MN
 ISO 3166-2 code:  US-MN
 Internet second-level domain:  .mn.us
 Nicknames
 Butter Country
 Bread and Butter State
 Bread Basket of the Nation
 Gopher State
 Land of 10,000 Lakes (currently used on license plates)
 Land of Lakes
 Land of Sky-Blue Waters
 North Star State
 State of Hockey
 Adjectival: Minnesota
 Demonym: Minnesotan

Geography of Minnesota 

Geography of Minnesota
 Minnesota is: a U.S. state, a federal state of the United States of America
 Location
 Northern hemisphere
 Western hemisphere
 Americas
 North America
 Anglo America
 Northern America
 United States of America
 Contiguous United States
 Canada–US border
 Central United States
 West North Central States
 Midwestern United States
Upper Midwest
 Great Lakes Region
 Population of Minnesota: 5,303,925  (2010 U.S. Census)
 Area of Minnesota:
 Atlas of Minnesota

Places in Minnesota 

 Historic places in Minnesota
 Ghost towns in Minnesota
 National Historic Landmarks in Minnesota
 Forts in Minnesota
 National Register of Historic Places listings in Minnesota
 Bridges on the National Register of Historic Places in Minnesota
 National Natural Landmarks in Minnesota
 State forests in Minnesota
 State parks in Minnesota
 County and regional parks in Minnesota

Environment of Minnesota 

Environment of Minnesota
 Climate of Minnesota
 Climate change
 Weather records of Minnesota
 Natural history of Minnesota
 Geology of Minnesota
 Protected areas in Minnesota
 State forests of Minnesota
 Superfund sites in Minnesota
 Wildlife of Minnesota
 Flora of Minnesota
 Aquatic plants of Minnesota
 Trees of Minnesota by family (by scientific name)
 Wildflowers of Minnesota
 Grasses, sedges, and rushes of Minnesota
 Fauna of Minnesota
 Amphibians of Minnesota
 Ants of Minnesota
 Birds of Minnesota
 Fish of Minnesota
 Mammals of Minnesota
 Reptiles of Minnesota
 Snakes of Minnesota

Natural geographic features of Minnesota 

 Ecoregions of Minnesota
 Lakes of Minnesota
 Rivers of Minnesota
 Streams of Minnesota

Regions of Minnesota 

Regions of Minnesota
 Central Minnesota
 Eastern Minnesota
 Twin Cities Metropolitan Region
 Northern Minnesota
 Arrowhead Region
 Red River Valley
 Northwest Angle
 Southern Minnesota
 Southeastern Minnesota

Administrative divisions of Minnesota 

 The 87 counties of the state of Minnesota
 Municipalities in Minnesota
 Cities in Minnesota
 State capital of Minnesota: Saint Paul
 Largest city of Minnesota: Minneapolis
 City nicknames in Minnesota
 Towns in Minnesota
 List of townships in Minnesota

Demography of Minnesota 

Demographics of Minnesota

Government and politics of Minnesota 

Politics of Minnesota
 Form of government: U.S. state government
 United States congressional delegations from Minnesota
 Minnesota State Capitol
 Elections in Minnesota
 Electoral reform in Minnesota
 Political party strength in Minnesota

Branches of the government of Minnesota 

Government of Minnesota

Executive branch of the government of Minnesota 
 Governor of Minnesota
 Lieutenant Governor of Minnesota
 Secretary of State of Minnesota
 State departments
 Minnesota Department of Employment and Economic Development
 Minnesota Department of Natural Resources
 Minnesota Department of Transportation
 Minnesota Housing Finance Agency
 Minnesota Indian Affairs Council
 Minnesota Public Utilities Commission
 Minnesota State Lottery
 Minnesota State Patrol

Legislative branch of the government of Minnesota 

 Minnesota Legislature (bicameral)
 Upper house: Minnesota Senate
 Lower house: Minnesota House of Representatives

Judicial branch of the government of Minnesota 

Courts of Minnesota
 Supreme Court of Minnesota

Law and order in Minnesota 

Law of Minnesota
 Cannabis in Minnesota
 Constitution of Minnesota
 Crime in Minnesota
 Gun laws in Minnesota
 Law enforcement in Minnesota
 Law enforcement agencies in Minnesota
 Minnesota State Police
 Prisons in Minnesota
 Same-sex marriage in Minnesota

Military in Minnesota 

 Minnesota Air National Guard
 Minnesota Army National Guard

History of Minnesota 

History of Minnesota

History of Minnesota, by period 
Prehistory of Minnesota
Indigenous peoples
English territory of Rupert's Land, 1670–1707
French colony of Canada, (1685–1699)
French colony of Louisiane, (1699–1764)
Treaty of Fontainebleau of 1762
Treaty of Paris of 1763
British territory of Rupert's Land, (1707–1818)-1870
History of the area of Minnesota east of the Mississippi River from 1763 to 1849:
British (though predominantly Francophone) Province of Quebec, (1763–1783)-1791
American Revolutionary War, April 19, 1775 – September 3, 1783
United States Declaration of Independence, July 4, 1776
Treaty of Paris, September 3, 1783
Unorganized territory of the United States, 1783–1787
Territory Northwest of the River Ohio, (1787–1800)-1803
Territory of Indiana, (1800–1809)-1816
Territory of Illinois, 1809–1818
War of 1812, June 18, 1812 – March 23, 1815
Treaty of Ghent, December 24, 1814
Anglo-American Convention of 1818
Northwest Angle
Territory of Michigan, 1805-(1818–1836)-1837
Winnebago War, 1827
Black Hawk War, 1832
Territory of Wisconsin, 1836–1848
Webster–Ashburton Treaty of 1842
Boundary Waters
Mexican–American War, April 25, 1846 – February 2, 1848
Unorganized Territory, 1821-(1848–1849)-1854
History of the area of Minnesota west of the Mississippi River from 1764 to 1849:
Spanish (though predominantly Francophone) district of Alta Luisiana, 1764–1803
Third Treaty of San Ildefonso of 1800
French district of Haute-Louisiane, 1803
Louisiana Purchase of 1803
Unorganized U.S. territory created by the Louisiana Purchase, 1803–1804
District of Louisiana, 1804–1805
Territory of Louisiana, 1805–1812
Territory of Missouri, 1812–1821
War of 1812, June 18, 1812 – March 23, 1815
Treaty of Ghent, December 24, 1814
Anglo-American Convention of 1818
Red River Valley of Rupert's Land
Unorganized Territory, (1821–1834)-1854
Territory of Michigan, 1805-(1834–1838)-1837
Territory of Iowa, 1838–1846
Unorganized Territory, 1821-(1846–1849)-1854
Mexican–American War, April 25, 1846 – February 2, 1848
Territory of Minnesota, 1849–1858
State of Minnesota becomes 32nd State admitted to the United States of America on May 11, 1858
American Civil War, April 12, 1861 – May 13, 1865
Minnesota in the American Civil War

History of Minnesota, by region 
 By City
 History of Minneapolis
 History of Northfield, Minnesota
 History of Richfield, Minnesota
 History of Saint Paul, Minnesota

History of Minnesota, by subject 
 History of music of Minnesota
 History of sports in Minnesota
 History of the Minnesota Twins
 Minnesota Twins Draft History
 History of the Minnesota Vikings
 Natural history of Minnesota

Culture of Minnesota 

Culture of Minnesota
 Cuisine of Minnesota
 Museums in Minnesota
 Religion in Minnesota
 Roman Catholic Archdiocese of Saint Paul and Minneapolis
 Franciscan Brothers of Peace
 Lutheran Church–Missouri Synod
 Minnesota North District
 Minnesota South District
 Episcopal Diocese of Minnesota
 Orthodox Church in America Diocese of the Midwest
 Synagogues in Minnesota
 Scouting in Minnesota
 State symbols of Minnesota
 Flag of the State of Minnesota 
 Great Seal of the State of Minnesota

The arts in Minnesota 
 Music of Minnesota
 Theater in Minnesota

Sports in Minnesota 

Sports in Minnesota
 American football
 NFL – Minnesota Vikings
 NCAA – Minnesota Golden Gophers football
 Women's Football Alliance – Minnesota Vixen
 Baseball
 MLB – Minnesota Twins
 NCAA – Minnesota Golden Gophers baseball
 Basketball
 NBA – Minnesota Timberwolves
 NCAA – Minnesota Golden Gophers men's basketball, Minnesota Golden Gophers women's basketball
 WNBA – Minnesota Lynx
 Ice hockey
 NHL – Minnesota Wild
 NCAA – Minnesota Golden Gophers men's ice hockey, Minnesota Golden Gophers women's ice hockey
 National Women's Hockey League – Minnesota Whitecaps
 Soccer
 MLS – Minnesota United FC
 Rugby football
 Minnesota Rugby Football Union – Blue Ox RFC,  Minneapolis Mayhem

Economy and infrastructure of Minnesota 

Economy of Minnesota
 Communications in Minnesota
 Newspapers in Minnesota
 Radio stations in Minnesota
 Television stations in Minnesota
 Energy in Minnesota
 Power stations in Minnesota
 Solar power in Minnesota
 Wind power in Minnesota
 Health care in Minnesota
 Hospitals in Minnesota
 Transportation in Minnesota
 Bicycling in Minnesota
 Rail trails in Minnesota
 Airports in Minnesota
 Rail transport in Minnesota
 Railroads in Minnesota
 Passenger rail in Minnesota
 Roads in Minnesota
 U.S. Highways in Minnesota
 Interstate Highways in Minnesota
 State highways in Minnesota

Education in Minnesota 

Education in Minnesota
 Schools in Minnesota
 School districts in Minnesota
 High schools in Minnesota
 Colleges and universities in Minnesota
 University of Minnesota system
 University of Minnesota
 University of Minnesota Duluth
 University of Minnesota Morris
 University of Minnesota Crookston
 University of Minnesota Rochester
 Minnesota State Colleges and Universities system
 St. Cloud State University
 Minnesota State University, Mankato
 Winona State University
 Metropolitan State University
 Minnesota State University Moorhead
 Southwest Minnesota State University
 Bemidji State University

See also

Topic overview:
Minnesota

Index of Minnesota-related articles

References

External links 

Minnesota
Minnesota